was a Japanese politician and general. He served as Imperial Japanese Army Commander of the Japanese Korean Army during the Mukden Incident and the invasion of Manchuria. He briefly served as Prime Minister of Japan in 1937.

Early life
Hayashi was born on 23 February 1876, in Kodatsuno, Kanazawa, Ishikawa Prefecture, the first son of secretary of Tonami District Office Hayashi Shishirō and his wife Bessho Saha. The family was a samurai-class family formerly in service to Kaga Domain. The second oldest of his brothers Hayashi Ryōzō became an Imperial Army Colonel, and the youngest brother Shirakawa Yūkichi became Vice Mayor of Tokyo.

Hayashi dropped out of school in July 1894 to enlist in the Imperial Japanese Army at the start of the First Sino-Japanese War. After the end of the war, he attended the Imperial Japanese Army Academy, and on graduation in June 1897 was assigned to the IJA 7th Infantry Regiment. in 1903, he graduated from the Army Staff College. With the start of the Russo-Japanese War, Hayashi participated in the Siege of Port Arthur.

Military career 

Hayashi's first major command from 1918 to 1920 was as commanding officer of the IJA 57th Infantry Regiment, followed by a time in 1921 attached to the Technical Research Headquarters and as an acting Military Investigator. From 1921 to 1923 he was the head of the Preparatory Course at the Imperial Japanese Army Academy, followed by a time attached to the Inspectorate General of Military Training. From 1923 to 1924 he was the Japanese Army Representative to the League of Nations, followed by another stint attached to the Inspectorate General of Military Training from 1924 to 1925.
  
In 1925, Hayashi became the commanding Officer of the IJA 2nd Infantry Brigade. In 1926 he was made Commandant of the Tokyo Bay Fortress. In 1927, he became the Commandant of the Army War College, followed in 1928 as Deputy Inspector-General of Military Training. Finally in 1929 he became the General Officer Commanding the Imperial Guards Division.

In 1930, Lieutenant-General Senjūrō Hayashi, was made Commander in Chief of the Japanese Korean Army. On the day after the Mukden Incident on 19 September, he ordered the IJA 20th Division to split its force, forming the 39th Mixed Brigade. Acting without authorization by the Emperor or central government in Tokyo, Hayashi ordered the 39th Mixed Brigade to cross the Yalu River that same day into Manchuria. The Cabinet was forced to concede the point to the military afterwards and the movement of the 39th Mixed Brigade from Korea was authorized on 22 September.

Following his command in Korea, Hayashi was made Inspector General of Military Training and a member of the Supreme War Council from 1932 to 1934. In 1932, he was awarded with the Order of the Sacred Treasure (1st class) and in 1934, he was awarded the Order of the Rising Sun (1st class).

Political career 

From 1934 to 1935 Hayashi was Army Minister, and again member of the Supreme War Council from 1935 until his retirement the next year.

As Army Minister, Hayashi was a supporter of Major General Tetsuzan Nagata, who was Chief of Military Bureau and the leader of the Tōseiha faction within the Imperial Japanese Army. The Tōseiha scored a victory in July 1935 when General Jinzaburō Masaki, one of the leaders of the Kōdōha faction was removed as Inspector General of Military Training. But Nagata was assassinated the next month(the Aizawa Incident). The struggle between the Tōseiha and Kōdōha factions continued below the surface of the government; and the war in North China carried on apace until February 1936.

Hayashi also promoted Fumimaro Konoe's doctrines, as a "right-winger" amongst the militarists, who approved of the "fiction" of democracy, and the Emperor's role with an "adviser group", against  "left-winger" radical militarists, led by Kingoro Hashimoto, wanted a Military Shogunate.

Hayashi also happen to the president of Greater Japan Muslim League (大日本回教協会, Dai Nihon Kaikyō Kyōkai).

Hayashi served as Prime Minister of Japan for a brief four-month period in 1937. Later from 1940 to 1941, he was a Privy Councillor. Hayashi suffered from an intracranial hemorrhage in January 1943 and died at his home of 4 February without regaining consciousness. He was posthumously awarded the Order of the Golden Kite (4th class) and the Order of the Paulownia Flowers. His grave is at the Tama Reien Cemetery in Fuchū, Tokyo.

Honours
From the corresponding article in the Japanese Wikipedia

Grand Cordon of the Order of the Sacred Treasure (1932)
Grand Cordon of the Order of the Rising Sun (1934)
Grand Cordon of the Order of the Rising Sun with Paulownia Flowers (1943; posthumous)

References

External links 

 Senjuro Hayashi
 

|-

|-

|-

|-

1876 births
1943 deaths
20th-century prime ministers of Japan
Prime Ministers of Japan
Japanese military personnel of the Russo-Japanese War
People from Kanazawa, Ishikawa
Japanese generals
Ministers of the Imperial Japanese Army
Government ministers of Japan
Foreign ministers of Japan
Imperial Rule Assistance Association politicians
20th-century Japanese politicians
Recipients of the Order of the Rising Sun
Recipients of the Order of the Sacred Treasure
Recipients of the Order of the Golden Kite